XHFW may refer to:

 XHFW-FM, a radio station (88.5 FM) in Tampico, Tamaulipas, Mexico
 XHFW-TDT, a television station (channel 26, virtual 10) in Tampico, Tamaulipas, Mexico